Myriam Marbé (April 9, 1931 in Bucharest – December 25, 1997 in Bucharest) was a Romanian composer and pianist.

Marbe received her first piano lessons from her mother, who was a pianist. She studied at the Bucharest Conservatory from 1944 to 1954, where she took classes in piano with Florica Musicescu and Silvia Căpățână, as well as in composition with Leon Klepper and Mihail Jora. From 1953 to 1965, she was a film director at the Casa de filme in Bucharest. She taught counterpoint and composition at the Bucharest Conservatory from 1954 to 1988, where her refusal to join the Romanian Communist Party prevented her from reaching the rank of Professor.

Between 1968 and 1972, she managed to obtain permission from Romanian authorities to travel to the West and participate in the Darmstadt New Music Summer School in West Germany, and in 1971, at the Royan Festival for Contemporary Music in France. After the collapse of Communism in Eastern Europe, she was awarded a working grant from the German city of Mannheim for the year 1989–90.

Besides being a composer, Marbe worked as a journalist and musicologist.  She coauthored a monograph on George Enescu and also wrote critical essays and analyses on musical style.

The composer's collection is located at the Sophie Drinker Institut in Bremen, and most of the scores are available at the institute's website.

Works
Nunta Zamfirei, ballet, 1954
Sonata for viola and piano, 1955
In Memoriam, lyrical piece for oboe, 2 horns, piano, celesta, drum set, and string orchestra, 1959
Sonata (Prologo – Aria – Epilogo) for 2 violas, 1966
Le Temps Inévitable, 1968–71
Serenata – Eine kleine Sonnenmusik, 1974
La parabol du grenier for an interpreter on piano, harpsichord, celesta, and optional glockenspiel and tubular bells, 1975–76
Concerto for Viola and Orchestra, 1977
Trium, symphonic piece for large orchestra, 1978
Souvenir d'un paysage inconnu for flute and viola, 1979
Timpul regasit for soprano or tenor, recorder, 3 violas, alto and tenor viol, and harpsichord, 1982
Trommelbass, for string trio and drums, 1985
Sonata per due for viola and flute, 1985
Des-cântec for woodwind quintet with doublings of piccolo, alto flute, english horn, e-flat clarinet, bass clarinet, and contrabassoon, 1985
An die Sonne for mezzo-soprano and saxophone, 1986
Concertul pentru Daniel Kientzy și saxofon, 1986
After nau, sonata for cello and organ, 1987
Ur-Ariadne-Sinfonie Nr. 1 for mezzo-soprano, saxophone, and orchestra, 1988
Dialogi – nicht nur ein Bilderbuch für Christian Morgenstern, 1989
Farbe und Klang, song cycle on texts by Ulrich von Liechtenstein, Heinrich von Veldeke, Heinrich Heine, Friedrich von Hausen, König Konrad, and Christian Morgenstern
Fra Angelico – Chagall – Voronet – Requiem for mezzo-soprano, choir, and chamber ensemble, 1990
Stabat mater for 12 voices and flute, oboe, clarinet, bassoon, trumpet, horn, trombone, percussion, viola, and double bass
Paos for viola and clarinet, 1995
Sym-phonia for mezzo-soprano and chamber ensemble on poems by Else Lasker-Schüler, 1996
arc-en-ciel for recorder and flute, 1997
Song of Ruth for 5 cellos, 1997

Notes

References
Thomas Beimel. Vom Ritual zur Abstraktion – über die rumänische Komponistin Myriam Marbe. Wuppertal and Unna: Tokkata-Verlag, 1994
 and Jeremias Schwarzer, ed. Myriam Marbe: Komponistin zwischen Ritual und Intellekt. Saarbrücken: PFAU-Verlag, 2001. .
 Kadja Grönke Sophie Drinker Institut – Priv.-Doz. Dr. Kadja Grönke. Vita – Würdigung – Nachlass: 

1931 births
1997 deaths
Musicians from Bucharest
National University of Music Bucharest alumni
Romanian classical composers
20th-century classical composers
Romanian classical pianists
Romanian women pianists
Romanian musicologists
Women musicologists
Romanian film directors
Romanian women film directors
20th-century classical pianists
Women classical composers
20th-century musicologists
Women classical pianists
20th-century women composers
20th-century women pianists